Mirza Kapetanović (born 30 June 1959) is a Bosnian-Herzegovinian defender who played for SFR Yugoslavia.

Club career
He was a member of the memorable Sarajevo squad that won the 1984–85 Yugoslav First League.

International career
He made his debut for Yugoslavia in a June 1983 friendly match against Romania and has earned a total of 6 caps, scoring no goals. His final international was a November 1985 FIFA World Cup qualification match away against France.

References

External links

 Profile at Serbian federation site

1959 births
Living people
Footballers from Sarajevo
Association football defenders
Yugoslav footballers
Yugoslavia international footballers
FK Sarajevo players
Kickers Offenbach players
Yugoslav First League players
2. Bundesliga players
Regionalliga players
Yugoslav expatriate footballers
Expatriate footballers in Germany
Yugoslav expatriate sportspeople in Germany